"Johnny Cakes" is the 73rd episode of the HBO original series The Sopranos and the eighth of the show's sixth season. Written by Diane Frolov and Andrew Schneider, and directed by Tim Van Patten, it originally aired on April 30, 2006.

Starring
 James Gandolfini as Tony Soprano
 Lorraine Bracco as Dr. Jennifer Melfi
 Edie Falco as Carmela Soprano
 Michael Imperioli as Christopher Moltisanti
 Dominic Chianese as Corrado Soprano, Jr.
 Steven Van Zandt as Silvio Dante
 Tony Sirico as Paulie Gualtieri *
 Robert Iler as Anthony Soprano, Jr.
 Jamie-Lynn Sigler as Meadow Soprano *
 Aida Turturro as Janice Soprano Baccalieri *
 Frank Vincent as Phil Leotardo
 Joseph R. Gannascoli as Vito Spatafore
 Dan Grimaldi as Patsy Parisi

* = credit only

Guest starring

Synopsis
A.J. spends most of his time hanging out in New York nightclubs. To afford more clubbing A.J. sells the drum kit Tony gave him. He asks his parents to provide him with a nightclub to manage, a suggestion they scoff at as he is still below the legal drinking age. Carmela wants him to study event planning and Tony offers to get him a place at Beansie's pizzeria. In a session with Dr. Melfi, Tony says that A.J.'s presence is "like a bad smell in the house. It's always hanging there."

One evening, after slumping at home all day, A.J. takes a knife and goes to see Junior in the mental hospital. When Junior sees him, he begs him to take him home. Unnerved, A.J. drops the knife before even attempting to use it against Junior, and is tackled by orderlies as he tries to flee. Using his influence with Assemblyman Zellman, Tony gets his son released from custody without charge. Tony is furious, but A.J. tearfully tells him that he was trying to avenge Tony in the same manner as Michael Corleone in The Godfather. During A.J.'s next night out clubbing, an acquaintance asks him to get Tony to help him in a dispute with his landlord. A.J. retreats to the restroom, where he has a panic attack.

Vito steals the cell phone of a fellow guest at his bed-and-breakfast in New Hampshire, and uses it to call his wife Marie. She begs him to come home and tells him that Phil wishes to put him through "treatment" for his homosexuality. He tells her not to trust Phil (who is pressuring Tony to find Vito and kill him). Vito tells Marie where to find $30,000 cash in the house.

Pretending to be a writer, Vito spends more time at Jim's diner. Jim is revealed to also be a father. One evening, Vito sees Jim performing a heroic rescue of a young child while working as a volunteer firefighter. He spends an evening with the firefighters at a local roadhouse; in the parking lot, Vito and Jim appear to kiss, but Vito then shoves him off. They throw punches and Jim leaves Vito beaten. Days later, Vito goes back to the diner. "Sometimes you tell a lie so long, you don't know when to stop," he says. They take a motorcycle ride together. In a field, under the falling leaves, they have sex.

Tony manages to make love to his wife for the first time since his injury. But he is attracted to another woman: Julianna Skiff, a real estate agent who approaches him with an offer from Jamba Juice to buy a building he owns, rented to a long-established company, Caputo's Poultry. Tony rejects the deal, stating that the poultry store is part of its neighborhood. He rejects a second offer but accepts the third  nearly half a million dollars  and she agrees that they should meet in her apartment to complete the paperwork. While Tony is dressing for the encounter, Carmela helps pick out a shirt for him and helps him to button it up. At Julianna's, after Tony signs the paperwork, they start kissing passionately, and Julianna starts unbuttoning his shirt. Tony makes her stop and abruptly departs. At home with Carmela he lashes out, saying he's angry because there's no smoked turkey in the fridge.

Burt and Patsy make collections in the neighborhood of Tony's property. They fail to extort money from the newly opened branch of a major coffee chain. Caputo furiously tells them Tony has sold his store premises. "What the fuck is happening to this neighborhood?" Patsy says.

First appearances
 Julianna Skiff: a real estate agent with whom Tony almost has an affair.
 Rhiannon: an ex-girlfriend of Hernan O'Brien, hanging out with A.J. and others at the nightclub.

Title reference 
 The episode's title refers to a johnnycake, a type of pancake that is a local specialty at a diner frequented by Vito. 
 "Johnny Cakes" also becomes Vito's pet name for Jim.

Production 
 The setting for the East Haledon Police Department was filmed at the police headquarters in West Orange, New Jersey. It was filmed in the back of the building to give the look of a more rural and suburban town in Northern New Jersey.

Other cultural references
 The film A.J. and his co-worker are watching and studying for the knife fight is The Hunted.
 Jim's diner patron asks Vito what the year was when Rocky Marciano fought Joe Louis.  Jim correctly identifies the year as 1951.
 In a scene where Julianna Skiff enters the Bada Bing! to meet with Tony, a UFC event is playing on the TV.
 One of Jim's firefighter friends teases another about emitting an "Yma Sumac scream" when a roof fell in.
 Two people - Dr. Elliot Kupferberg and a girl A.J. meets at a club - erroneously refer to the Omertà, the Mafia code of silence. The girl believes it instructs who exactly should carry out an act of revenge hit for an attacked Mafia member and Elliot thinks the Omertà precludes mobsters from speaking out about their personal feelings.
 In a scene where A.J. spends the afternoon being lazy at home (despite asking his mother to wake him at 10 AM), he watches the Aqua Teen Hunger Force episode "Escape from Leprechaupolis" on the living room TV. A poster of American metal band Tool can be seen in A.J.'s room.
 When A.J. is detained for bringing a knife when he visited Junior, Tony is angry with him and tells him that what happened between Junior and him is not A.J.'s concern. A tearful A.J. mentions that every time they watch The Godfather where Michael Corleone kills the men who tried to kill his dad, Tony says it is his favorite scene of all time.

Music
 The song that plays outdoors, when Burt and Patsy first enter Caputo's Poultry, is a variation of Tic, Tic Tac by the Brazilian band Carrapicho
 The song playing when Vito is in the diner is "Sunny Came Home" by Shaun Colvin.
 The songs playing in the New York club are "Ready2Wear" (Paper Faces Remix) by Felix Da Housecat and "E Talking" by Soulwax.
 The song that is played at the Bada Bing! during Julianna and Tony's conversation is "Family Affair" by Mary J. Blige.
 The song played during the end credits is "I'm Gonna Move to the Outskirts of Town" by Ray Charles.

External links
"Johnny Cakes"  at HBO

2006 American television episodes
The Sopranos (season 6) episodes
Television episodes directed by Tim Van Patten